In Veerashaiva theology the Panchacharas denote the five codes of conduct to be followed by the devotee.  The Panchacharas include

 Sivāchāra – acknowledging Shiva as the supreme divine being and upholding the equality and well-being of all human beings.
 Lingāchāra – Daily worship of the individual Ishtalinga icon, one to three times day.
 Sadāchāra – Attention to vocation and duty, and adherence to the seven rules of conduct issued by Basavanna:
 (Do not steal)
 (Do not kill or hurt)
 (Do not utter lies)
 (Do not praise yourself, i.e. practice humility)
 (Do not criticize others)
 (Shun anger)
 (Do not be intolerant towards others)
 Bhrityāchāra – Compassion towards all creatures.
 Ganāchāra – Defence of the community and its tenets.

References

Lingayatism